WCHA could refer to:

Ice hockey
Western Collegiate Hockey Association, an NCAA Division I ice hockey-only college athletic conference, commonly known as the WCHA.
WCHA Final Five, playoff championship of the Western Collegiate Hockey Association.

Radio
WCHA (AM), a radio station broadcasting at 800 kHz on the AM band, licensed to Chambersburg, Pennsylvania.

Computer programming
wchar.h, computer programming term for a header file.	
Wchar t, also known as wide character, a type of computer character datatype.